The Hustler is an American television game show that aired on ABC from January 4 to September 23, 2021. Hosted by Craig Ferguson, it follows five contestants who collaborate to build up a cash prize by answering a series of trivia questions. One of the contestants is secretly designated as the Hustler beforehand and given the answers to all the questions. By the end of the game, two of the honest contestants have been eliminated; the other two must correctly choose the Hustler in order to stop them from winning the entire prize.

In April 2022, it was reported that the series was cancelled.

Gameplay 
The game consists of a total of 10 questions, each with four multiple-choice options. All of the questions are themed after the Hustler's personal life and interests. A hint about the Hustler is revealed on each turn, and the question is related to it. For example, if the clue indicates the Hustler is a fan of a television show, the question might concern a detail about that show.

The team is given 60 seconds to discuss the question and decide on an answer. The Hustler has been given all the correct answers ahead of time and may use this knowledge as desired throughout the game. If the players do not reach a consensus before time runs out, they are given a few extra seconds to choose a response; a failure to do so forfeits the money for that turn. Each of the first nine questions adds $10,000 to the bank for a correct answer, while the last question doubles the entire total for a correct answer or cuts it in half for an incorrect answer. The team can bank up to $180,000 over the course of the game.

Eliminations 
The Hustler eliminates one honest contestant each after the third and sixth questions. To protect their identity, every contestant is given a ballot with all five names and must mark one of them. The contestants place their ballots in envelopes and give them to the host, who sends them out of the studio via pneumatic tube capsule. The honest contestants' votes are discarded, and the Hustler's choice is eliminated with no winnings and must leave the studio through an exit concealed in a bookcase.

Final vote 
After the tenth question, the three remaining contestants each declare their guess at the Hustler's identity by placing cards with that person's name in front of their chairs. They are then given two minutes to debate the issue and may change their votes as desired during this period.

The true Hustler then stands up. If both of the honest contestants have voted correctly, they split the bank. Otherwise, the Hustler wins the entire bank.

Episodes

Series overview

Season 1 (2021)

Season 2 (2021)

Production 
The series was picked up by ABC on October 12, 2019, and began production during late fall. The series premiered as a sneak preview on January 4, 2021, before moving to its regular timeslot on January 7, 2021. On April 7, 2021, the series was renewed for a second season, which premiered on June 17, 2021.

On April 1, 2022, it was reported that the series was cancelled after two seasons.

Reception

Ratings

Season 1

Season 2

Notes

References

External links 
 
 

English-language television shows
2020s American game shows
2021 American television series debuts
2021 American television series endings
American Broadcasting Company original programming
Television series by All3Media
Television series by Disney–ABC Domestic Television